Frostweed is a common name for several plants and may refer to:

Helianthemum or Crocanthemum , in the family Cistaceae
Verbesina virginica in the family Asteraceae